Pasi Johan Olavi Nurminen (born December 17, 1975) is a Finnish former professional ice hockey goaltender. He was drafted by the Atlanta Thrashers as their sixth-round pick, #189 overall, in the 2001 NHL Entry Draft.

Nurminen started his playing career with Reipas Lahti in Finland and later moved on to Ketterä Imatra and Pelicans. In 1998 he moved to HPK and then to Jokerit a year later, where he won the Urpo Ylönen trophy as best goaltender in the SM-liiga.  After two season with Jokerit, he moved across the Atlantic to represent the Atlanta Thrashers. Nurminen played for Malmö IF in the Swedish Elitserien, and his hometown team, Pelicans, during the NHL lockout. He retired in the fall of 2005 due to a serious knee injury. He currently works as a goaltending consultant for Pelicans, the SM-liiga hockey team he also partially owns. Starting from 2010, he also serves the same role for the Finnish National Team and has even featured as their backup goalie during the Euro Hockey Tour.

Career statistics

Regular season and playoffs

International

Awards
 Urpo Ylönen trophy - 2000
 Jack A. Butterfield Trophy - 2002

External links

 Pasi Nurmisen Ilmaveivi (Mertaranta edit)

1975 births
Living people
Atlanta Thrashers draft picks
Atlanta Thrashers players
Chicago Wolves players
Finnish ice hockey goaltenders
HPK players
Ice hockey players at the 2002 Winter Olympics
Imatran Ketterä players
Jokerit players
Malmö Redhawks players
Olympic ice hockey players of Finland
Lahti Pelicans players
Sportspeople from Lahti